Francis O'Brien (born 7 April 1943) is a former Irish Fianna Fáil politician. He was a Senator from 1989 to 2011, elected by the Agricultural Panel.

O'Brien is a native of Latton, near Ballybay, in County Monaghan. He was a member of Monaghan County Council from 1979 until 2003, serving as Council chairman in 1986 to 1987.

On 14 June 2010, the Irish Independent reported that in 2006, O'Brien spent millions of euro on agricultural land outside the village of Inniskeen, County Monaghan in the hope that it would be rezoned for housing. However, the Inniskeen Action Committee opposed the development and, despite several Fianna Fáil councillors voting for the rezoning, the motion was defeated by Fine Gael and Sinn Féin councillors. The land is now worth a fraction of the purchase price.

O'Brien did not contest the 2011 Seanad election. In November 2013, he was sentenced to two years' imprisonment and a further year suspended, after pleading guilty with two other men to a charge of demanding €100,000 with menaces from Michael Heelan at Carrickmacross on 27 April 2012.

References

1943 births
Living people
Fianna Fáil senators
Irish farmers
Local councillors in County Monaghan
Members of the 19th Seanad
Members of the 20th Seanad
Members of the 21st Seanad
Members of the 22nd Seanad
Members of the 23rd Seanad